The Doctrina Christiana was an early book on the catechism of the Catholic Church, written in 1593 by Fray Juan de Plasencia, and is believed to be one of the earliest printed books in the Philippines.

Title

Spanish title:

In English:

In Tagalog (Filipino):

History

There is some controversy about which of the versions is the first printed book in Spanish Philippines, with some scholars believing that the Chinese-language version titled  Doctrina Christiana en letra y lengua China, compuesta por los padres ministros de los Sangleyes, de la Orden de Sancto Domingo. Con licencia, por Keng yong, China, en el parian de Manila by Fray Miguel de Benavides, OP, was printed between 1590 and 1592 by the Chinese printer Keng Yong in Manila before the Spanish and Tagalog versions.

One of the earliest references to both versions comes from Gómez Pérez Dasmariñas, the seventh Spanish Governor-General of the Philippines, who wrote a letter to Philip II of Spain on June 20, 1593, that read:

Missionary fathers placed the Doctrina among the books necessary to have in print in foreign lands. As such, the Filipino book is similar to one printed in Mexico in 1539 in Spanish and local Mexican vernacular, followed by Saint Francis Xavier’s Doutrina Christão in Malay printed by the Jesuit press at Goa in 1557. Another Doctrina was printed in Spanish and the native languages at Lima in 1584.

Extant print copies
Apart from the copy in the Library of Congress in Washington, DC, there are no other known copies in existence today. Both the quality of the paper, age, natural agents and disasters such as earthquakes and fires all contributed to the disappearance of most printed copies. The only known existing copies of early Philippine books are those sent to Europe during the 16th, 17th, and 18th centuries, which may lie uncatalogued in some library.

Such was the case for the copy sent to Philip II of Spain by the Governor-General Dasmariñas in 1593. This is believed to be the same copy that reappeared in 1946 in the possession of a Parisian bookseller and collector who specialised in Pacific imprints. William H. Schab, a New York City dealer, purchased the book and took it to the United States, where he resold it to Lessing J. Rosenwald, who in turn presented it to the Library of Congress where it remains today. The only known surviving copy of the Chinese version is stored at the Biblioteca Nacional in Madrid.

Contents
The title literally means “The Teachings of Christianity”, and thus the primary goal of the book was to propagate Christian teaching across the Philippine archipelago. The book consists of 38 leaves and 74 pages of text in Spanish, Tagalog transliterated into roman letters, and Tagalog in its original Tagalog Baybayin (Sulat Tagalog) script, under a woodcut of Saint Dominic, with the verso originally blank, although in contemporary versions bears the manuscript inscription, "Tassada en dos reales", signed Juan de Cuellar.

After a syllabary comes the basic prayers: the Lord's Prayer, Hail Mary, Credo, and the Salve Regina. Following these are Articles of Faith, the Ten Commandments, Commandments of the Holy Church, Sacraments of the Holy Church, Seven Mortal Sins, Fourteen Works of Charity, the Confiteor and a brief Catechism.

Characteristics
The book was printed on paper made from mulberry. The size of the volume, which is unbound, is 9⅛ by 7 inches, although individual leaves vary somewhat due to chipping. Some of the leaves have become separated from their complements, but enough remain in the original stitching to indicate that the book was originally made up in four gatherings, the first of twelve leaves, the second of ten, the third of ten, and the fourth of six. Although the book is of the size called quarto, the method of printing must have been page by page, so it is doubtful that each sheet was folded twice in the usual quarto manner, but more probable that it was printed four pages to a sheet of paper approximately 9⅛ by 14 inches, which was folded once.

The volume was printed using the xylographic technique, printing each page of text from one hand carved woodblock. Vertical lines long the inner margins of some pages were made by the inked edge of the block, and the grain of the wood appears as striations throughout the printed areas.

See also
Catechism for Filipino Catholics, the 20th-century successor to the Doctrina Christiana
Christianity in the Philippines
Roman Catholicism in the Philippines

References

External links
 Full text of Doctrina Christiana at Project Gutenberg
 Doctrina Christiana: The First Book Printed in the Philippines available at Filipiniana.net
Doctrina Christiana From the Rare Book and Special Collections Division at the Library of Congress

Philippine books
Spanish-language books
Tagalog language
1593 books
Chinese-language books